Filtered beer refers to any ale, lager, or fermented malt beverage in which the sediment left over from the brewing process has been removed. Ancient techniques included the use of straw mats, cloth, or straws, and frequently left some sediment in the drink. Modern filtration, introduced at the end of the 19th century, uses a mechanical process that can remove all sediment, including yeast, from the beer. Such beer is known as bright beer and requires force carbonation before bottling or serving from a keg. In the United Kingdom, a beer which has been filtered in the brewery is known as "brewery-conditioned", as opposed to unfiltered cask ales.

Filtration

Beer is mechanically filtered by flowing the beer through layers of filter material; the two main techniques are surface filtration and cake filtration. Filters range from rough filters that remove much of the yeast and any solids (e.g. hops, grain particles) left in the beer, to filters fine enough to strain colour and body from the beer. The normal filtration ratings are defined as rough, fine or sterile. Rough filtration leaves some cloudiness in the beer, but it is noticeably clearer than unfiltered beer. Fine filtration yields a beer which is nearly transparent and not cloudy, although observation of the scattering of light through the beer will reveal the presence of some small particles. Finally, as its name implies, sterile filtration is fine enough that almost all microorganisms in the beer have been removed. Beer which has been filtered is usually held in "bright tanks" at the brewery before bottling or additional treatment.

A beer which is filtered is stable, so all conditioning has stopped - as such it is termed "brewery-conditioned". Beers which are in contact with the yeast are known as bottle-conditioned or cask-conditioned.

Sheet filters use pre-made media and are relatively straightforward. The sheets are manufactured to allow only particles smaller than a given size through, and the brewer is free to choose how finely to filter the beer. The sheets are placed into the filtering frame, sterilized (with hot water, for example) and then used to filter the beer. The sheets can be flushed if the filter becomes blocked, and usually the sheets are disposable and are replaced between filtration sessions. Often the sheets contain powdered filtration media to aid in filtration.

Pre-made filters have two sides: one with loose holes, and the other with tight holes. Flow goes from the side with loose holes to the side with the tight holes, with the intent that large particles get stuck in the large holes while leaving enough room around the particles and filter medium for smaller particles to go through and get stuck in tighter holes.

Sheets are sold in nominal ratings, and typically 90% of particles larger than the nominal rating are caught by the sheet. For sterile filtration, a typical size is 1 micrometre or less.

Filters that use a powder medium are considerably more complicated to operate, but can filter much more beer before needing to be regenerated. Common media include diatomaceous earth (kieselguhr) and perlite.

Cold filtering
Though all filtering is done cold, the term cold filtering is used for a filtering process in which the beer is chilled so the protein molecules clump together and are easier to filter out. Breweries tend to differentiate cold filtered beers from those that have been heat pasteurised.

Bright beer

When a beer has been left to allow the yeast to settle at the bottom of the vessel in which it is held (usually a conditioning or lagering tank), it has "dropped bright". Finings can be introduced during the production of beer in order to induce it to drop bright more readily.

Home brewed beer

Beer filtration is also common on a small scale.  It is not uncommon for homebrewers (those who brew their own beer at home, often in small batches around ) to filter their own beer.  While they lack the sophisticated equipment of large-scale breweries, they can achieve satisfactory results using canister filters with successive, replaceable filter cartridges or pads. Most homebrewers will only filter their beer down to 5 μm to remove the majority of yeast and sediment, although some may filter their beer down to 1.0 or 0.5 μm.  Anything smaller introduces risk of removing flavor and beneficial compounds.

References

External links

Brewing
Beer vessels and serving